Yacine Sene (born 18 March 1982 in Orléans, France) is a French basketball player who played 25 times for the French women's  national basketball team from 2008-2010.

References

French women's basketball players
1982 births
Living people
Sportspeople from Orléans
21st-century French women